

Dinosaurs

Pterosaurs

New taxa

Synapsids

Ophiacodontidae

Paleontologists
 Birth of Friedrich von Huene, the well known German paleontologist.

References

1870s in paleontology
Paleontology, 1875 In